Dagoretti is an area in the western part of Nairobi, the capital of Kenya. It straddles the Nairobi and Kiambu County boundary with the Dagoretti Road Reserve marking the psychological border point heading Northerly and North-Easterly. Administratively it is one of eight divisions of Nairobi. The Dagoretti division is divided into six Locations. The former electoral Dagoretti Constituency had the same boundaries as the now defuct Dagoretti division.

Locations

Administration
Vast parts of the Dagoretti area fall within Nairobi County's administration. Parts of the area among them the Dagoretti Slaughterhouse fall in the Kiambu side of the border under the defunct Kikuyu Municipality area.

It is worth noting that the area under the present-day Dagoretti South Constituency was originally part of the defunct County Council of Kiambu but was moved into the then Nairobi City Commission's administration in the 1970s as part of efforts to expand the city area. To-date, the freehold title deeds possessed by land owners in the area are labelled as belonging to Kiambu.

Transport 
The Main form of Transport is by road, small buses (matatus) and buses (Kenya Bus Service, City Hoppa, City Shuttle and Connection Bus) offer short distance trips to the City Centre.

The Dagoretti railway station is on the main line of the national railway system.

Economic activities 
The main form of income is in industrial labor, construction, household chores, small scale trading on groceries, and careers in carpentry, masonry and tailoring.also middle class population working in nearby schools, hospitals and other government institutions.

History 
It is difficult to say when Dagoretti was first inhabited. But by the late 1890s when Europeans first visited the area, they found a populated and cultivated territory.

19th century Dagoretti was part of the rich food-producing Kikuyu country and was populated with Masai and Kikuyu people as it lay on the edge of Masai Country. Kikuyu farmed sugar cane and banana among other crops while Maasai kept cattle. The two groups cohabited and their lives together ebbed between trade and raid. In fact some Kikuyus spoke Maasai, some Maasai spoke Gikuyu. The prominent Kikuyu leader Waiyaki wa Hinga is believed to have Maasai heritage.

In August 1890 Fredrick Lugard departed Mombasa for Lake Victoria on behalf of the Imperial British East Africa Company. Part of his mission was to establish treaties with local tribes and build forts along the route to Lake Victoria. Lugard arrived at Dagoertti by October 1890 having walked over 350 miles from Mombasa with his entourage of Sudanese askaris led by Shukri Aga; Somali scouts led by Dualla Idris and nearly 300 Swahili porters.

Idris had already visited Dagoretti a few years earlier while serving on Count Sámuel Teleki's 1886 -1889 expedition to Lake Turkana.

At Dagoretti Lugard was introduced to local leader and land owner Waiyaki wa Hinga with whom he formed an alliance by participating in a traditional blood brotherhood ceremony. Waiyaki helped Lugard identify a piece of land on which to built a fort. The fort at Dagoretti was the seventh IBEAC fort and the first north of Machakos.

See also 
 Railway stations in Kenya

References 

Populated places in Kenya
Suburbs of Nairobi